Pirate Cat Radio (87.9 FM) was a low power community radio station that had been broadcasting since April 1996 in the San Francisco Bay Area.  The station was one of many unlicensed radio stations operating in the San Francisco Bay Area.

Station founder Daniel Roberts, says that he started broadcasting Pirate Cat Radio out of his bedroom in Los Gatos, California (a suburb in the San Francisco Bay Area) at the age of 15, despite receiving hundreds of "Notices of Unlicensed Radio Operation" from the Federal Communications Commission (FCC).

Roberts claimed on multiple occasions that the station was able to stay on the air based on a clause in FCC regulations that allows a licensing exemption in times of war. However, the FCC rewrote the wartime clause rules following a case in April 2008.

By 2005, Roberts claimed that he had been sent 160 warning letters from the FCC, and that he was not bothered by the possibility of his signal interfering with other broadcasters. He continued to ignore FCC letters, and reasoned that although his transmitting equipment could be seized, it would not be likely to be prosecuted for broadcasting illegally. Plans were made to form a pirate television station similar to Berkeley pirate radio legend Stephen Dunifer’s low-cost experimental setup, but ultimately all that was broadcast were a catalog of DivX .avi files on a homebrew server, though the station was actively soliciting more content at that time.

In a radio interview with Skidmark Bob on Free Radio Santa Cruz in May 2005, Roberts discusses obtaining and rebroadcasting copies of BBC’s Doctor Who series before being available in the United States. Roberts called on listeners to "set up your own station and start playing whatever you want on TV … Now is the time, get on it." Roberts claimed that the online stream could hold up to 800 people, and planned for Pirate Cat Radio to reach 1000 watts using a directional Yagi-Uda antenna he had built.

Pirate Cat Radio rebroadcast The Howard Stern Show in 2006 in its uncensored form from Sirius Satellite Radio in the Los Angeles area without permission, although the signal was inconsistent. Stern himself expressed frustration that his subscription-based show was being spread for free, pleading with his audience to "just pay the 42 cents a day" for the Sirius service to access his content. The FCC had previously in 2004 cited Stern’s show on Clear Channel for "repeated graphic and explicit sexual descriptions" prior to moving to Sirius. Listeners to the illegal rebroadcasts did claim to have heard profane content on 88.3 FM in Los Angeles.

A physical location and café were opened in January 2008 for DJs and live audiences in the Mission District, San Francisco, built out by the staff.

In March 2009, Anthony Bourdain brought his show No Reservations to San Francisco and visited Pirate Cat Radio to try the Bacon Maple Latte, a unique creation of baristas of the Pirate Cat Radio Cafe. An account of his visit aired on the Travel Channel in early August 2009. That same month, the San Francisco Board of Supervisors recognized Pirate Cat Radio for the station's "...trailblazing efforts towards freeing the airwaves from corporate control, providing the community with training in radio broadcast skills, empowering voices ignored by traditional media outlets; and contributing to the advancement of the City's coffee culture…".

In May 2010, some of Pirate Cat Radio's programming was edited for content and rebroadcast on licensed station KPDO 89.3.

After years of hundreds of warnings, in April 2009 Federal Communications Commission regulators discovered one of the Pirate Cat Radio transmitters on a rooftop in Twin Peaks, broadcasting the station at a frequency higher than the legal limit. The FCC fined Roberts $10,000, forcing the station off the air and causing it to transition into an internet-only radio station with podcasts. The fine was issued for broadcasting without a formal license from the FCC. In an interview, Roberts was quoted as saying "You know, a fine is bad, but I don’t want to go to jail. I look very bad in orange."

See also
 Pirate radio in North America
 Community radio
 Low-power broadcasting
 Pirate television

References

External links
 Pirate Cat Radio

Community radio stations in the United States
Pirate radio stations in the United States
Radio stations in the San Francisco Bay Area
Radio stations established in 1996
Defunct radio stations in the United States